Cap Point (French Pointe du Cap) is the northernmost point in Saint Lucia in the Caribbean.

References

Landforms of Saint Lucia